Alfred Brooke-Smith (1874–1938) was the Chairman of the Shanghai Municipal Council for 2 years from 1920 to 1922. He also served as Managing Director of Jardine Matheson & Co.

Biography

Brooke-Smith was born on 3 November 1874 in Yokohama, Japan and received his education there. His parents were William Henry Smith and Gertrude Brooke. His grandfather was John Henry Brooke and his uncle was Edmund Walpole Brooke. 

At the age of 16, he joined the  firm of Findlay Richardson in Yokohama.   In 1897, he joined Jardine Matheson & Co as an assistant in their Import and Cotton Mill Department in Hong Kong.  On 1 May 1918, he was appointed a Director and was Senior Director at Shanghai from 1919 to 1926.  He was also Managing Director in 1924-5.

He served on the Shanghai Municipal Council from 1917 and, in 1919, became Vice-Chairman.  In 1920 he became Chairman of the Council and served in that position until 1922.

He retired in 1926 and returned to England.

He died on 6 April 1938 at Martley Hall, Suffolk, England.

Marriage

Brooke-Smith married Ann Bigland Brand, daughter of Mr David Brand of Shanghai, in December 1918 at the Holy Trinity Cathedral, Shanghai.

References

History of Shanghai
Chairmen of the Shanghai Municipal Council
1874 births
1938 deaths
British expatriates in Japan
British expatriates in China